Koie Jane Na (translation: No One Knows) is an Indian thriller television series that aired on STAR Plus between 7 March 2004 to 30 May 2004. The series had 13 episodes that aired once a week Every Sunday at 9pm.

Plot
Divya is an orphan girl who lives alone in a farmhouse in an isolated town. Krish Rajvansh is from a rich affluent family from Mumbai. Krish stumbles upon Divya and instantly falls in love with her. Divya reciprocates his love and they get married. Krish brings Divya to his family who all live in an imposing Rajvansh Manor. The new bride's arrival in the family coincides with many hauntings in family. Many messages in blood appear on the walls of the manor and Divya is terrorized by a ghost girl. Divya investigates and finds out that the two patriarch of the family brothers Kailash and Rudra Rajvansh were given magical powers in inheritance but Rudra started misusing his powers which resulted a curse being placed on the new bride of Rajvansh family- her.

Cast
Shilpa Kadam: Divya Rajvansh
Sanjeet Bedi: Krish Rajvansh
Shishir Sharma: Rudra Rajvansh/Kailash Rajvansh
Shreya Das 
Ashita Dhawan
Sumeet Pathak
Prabha Sinha
Addite Shirwaikar
Vivek Mushran

References

External links 
Official Site
Official Website at Rajshri

2004 Indian television series debuts
2005 Indian television series endings
Indian drama television series
Indian horror fiction television series
2000s Indian television miniseries
StarPlus original programming